James Porter (dates of birth and death unknown) was an English cricketer. Porter's batting and bowling styles are unknown.

Porter made his first-class debut for Sheffield Cricket Club (aka Yorkshire) against Manchester in 1844, with him making two further first-class appearances against the same opposition in 1845. He scored a total of 24 runs in his three matches, averaging 6 runs per innings and with a highest score of 17.

References

External links
James Porter at ESPNcricinfo
James Porter at CricketArchive

English cricketers
Yorkshire cricketers